Young and Willing is a 1943 American comedy film produced and directed by Edward H. Griffith and starring William Holden, Eddie Bracken, Robert Benchley, and Susan Hayward. With a screenplay by Virginia Van Upp based on the play Out of the Frying Pan by Francis Swann, the film is about young, aspiring actors—three men and three women—who combine their resources and move into the same apartment, hoping to keep the landlady in the dark until they can become famous. Young and Willing was made by Paramount Pictures (as Cinema Guild Productions) and distributed by United Artists.

Plot

Struggling young actors (three males and three females) share an apartment to make ends meet. This scenario is pretty daring considering the conservative and censorious attitudes of that period.  The landlady provides a play to the actors that turns out to have been left behind long ago by a destitute, evicted tenant (Robert Benchley). That former tenant is now a successful theater producer and playwright who has recently taken a room in his old haunts to recharge his creativity and try to rewrite his first play—one that the landlady had kept when he was evicted. The young actors attempt to sell his own play to him. Complications begin when Cousin Muriel (Florence MacMichael) visits and discovers the sinful cohabitation; she tattles to her folks, who charge over to investigate and drag the daughters home. Silliness and mayhem ensue, propelled by Muriel's actions and highlighted by her unique little-girl, tattletale voice.

Cast
 William Holden as Norman Reese
 Eddie Bracken as George Bodell
 Robert Benchley as Arthur Kenny
 Susan Hayward as Kate Benson
 Martha O'Driscoll as Dottie Coburn
 Barbara Britton as Marge Benson Dennison
 Mabel Paige as Mrs. Garnet
 Florence MacMichael as Muriel Foster
 James Brown as Tony Dennison
 Jay Fassett as J.T. Coburn
 Paul Hurst as First Cop
 Olin Howland as Second Cop
 Billy Bevan as Phillips

Production
The play on which the film is based opened at the Windsor Theatre, New York City, on February 11, 1941, with Alfred Drake, Barbara Bel Geddes, and Mabel Paige in the cast.

References

External links
 
 
 

1943 comedy films
1943 films
1940s English-language films
Films scored by Victor Young
American films based on plays
United Artists films
American comedy films
American black-and-white films
Films directed by Edward H. Griffith
1940s American films